The Unborn is the second album by Finnish melodic death metal band Mors Principium Est. A limited edition digipak version was also released, with two bonus tracks.

Track listing

Personnel

Band members
 Jori Haukio – guitar, programming and djembe
 Ville Viljanen – vocals
 Jarkko Kokko – guitar
 Mikko Sipola – drums
 Teemu Heinola – bass
 Joona Kukkola – keyboards

Guest musician
 Maiju Tommila – vocalist

Other credits
 Ahti Kortelainen – recording and mixing
 Mika Jussila – mastering
 Jori Haukio and Mors Principium Est – production
 Mattias Norén – cover art
 Toni Mailanen – booklet artwork, layout and photography

2005 albums
Mors Principium Est albums
Listenable Records albums